The Minot Commercial Historic District is a  historic district in Minot, North Dakota that was listed on the National Register of Historic Places in 1980.  It includes Classical Revival, Early Commercial, and Late Victorian.  The listing included 40 contributing buildings.

It includes an Italianate style Masonic Hall building, on Main Street, built in 1907, and a Sons of Norway building at the intersection of Broadway and Central that was built in 1915. The latter "is an eclectic mixture of Neo-Classical elements dominated by a central three-story facade with Renaissance Revival details."

See also
Downtown Minot

References

External links

Commercial buildings on the National Register of Historic Places in North Dakota
Victorian architecture in North Dakota
Neoclassical architecture in North Dakota
Buildings designated early commercial in the National Register of Historic Places
Buildings and structures in Minot, North Dakota
Historic districts on the National Register of Historic Places in North Dakota
National Register of Historic Places in Ward County, North Dakota